6708 Bobbievaile, provisional designation , is a stony background asteroid and asynchronous binary system from the inner regions of the asteroid belt, approximately  in diameter. It was discovered on 4 January 1989, by Australian astronomer Robert McNaught at the Siding Spring Observatory in New South Wales, Australia. It is named after Bobbie Vaile.

Orbit and classification 

Bobbievaile is a stony, non-family asteroid from the main belt's background population. It orbits the Sun in the inner main-belt at a distance of 2.0–2.9 AU once every 3 years and 10 months (1,397 days). Its orbit has an eccentricity of 0.18 and an inclination of 12° with respect to the ecliptic.

Binary asteroid 

On 7 May 2009, it was announced that Bobbievaile was determined to be a binary asteroid based on a series of lightcurve observations. The primary is probably spherical.

Naming 

This minor planet was named in memory of Australian astrophysicist Roberta Anne "Bobbie" Vaile (1959–1996), lecturer at Western Sydney University. She was a SETI enthusiast and participated in both the establishment of the SETI Australia Centre and the conduction of Project Phoenix. The official naming citation was published by the Minor Planet Center on 22 April 1997.

References

External links 
 Simostronomy—The Remarkable Bobbie Vaile
 (6708) Bobbievaile, datasheet, johnstonsarchive.net
 Asteroids with Satellites, Robert Johnston, johnstonsarchive.net
 Asteroid Lightcurve Database (LCDB), query form (info )
 Dictionary of Minor Planet Names, Google books
 Discovery Circumstances: Numbered Minor Planets (5001)-(10000) – Minor Planet Center
 
 

006708
Discoveries by Robert H. McNaught
Named minor planets
006708
19890104